Silent Library may refer to:
 Silent Library, a segment from the Japanese variety show Downtown no Gaki no Tsukai ya Arahende!!
 Silent Library (TV series), an American television game show that aired on MTV